Efrosini Xera (born 12 June 1992) is a Greek football defender.

External links 
 

1992 births
Living people
Women's association football defenders
Greek women's footballers
Greece women's international footballers
21st-century Greek women